BVV may refer to:

 IATA code for Burevestnik Airport
 Big Van Vader (1955–2018), American professional wrestler and gridiron football player
 Brno Exhibition Centre, Czech: Brněnské výstaviště
 BVV Barendrecht, an association football club in Barendrecht, Netherlands

See also
 BW (disambiguation)